Kintore  may refer to:


Places

Australia
 Kintore, Northern Territory
 Kintore, Western Australia
 Kintore Avenue, a street in South Australia
 County of Kintore, South Australia

Canada
 Kintore, Ontario
 Lower Kintore, New Brunswick
 Upper Kintore, New Brunswick

Scotland
 Kintore, Aberdeenshire

Other uses
 Kintore (Parliament of Scotland constituency)
 Earl of Kintore